Allan Baker may refer to:

 Allan Baker, Australian rapist and double murderer
 Allan J. Baker (1943–2014), Canadian ornithologist